Pamela Baird, born Pamela Beaird in Bexar County, Texas on April 6, 1945, is a former television actress, best remembered for playing Mary Ellen Rogers, the girlfriend of Wally Cleaver on Leave It to Beaver. In 1963, she graduated from Covina High School in Covina, California, and then graduated from Westminster Choir College, Princeton, New Jersey in 1968.

In 1973, Baird married fellow Texan Robert Hensley, and the couple had five children.

Acting career
Her first recurring role was of Hildy Broeberg on the 1956 - 1957 western series My Friend Flicka. She played Nancy, one of Kelly's (Noreen Corcoran's) friends on the sitcom Bachelor Father from 1957 to 1962.

Baird is best known for her role as "Mary Ellen Rogers", the girlfriend of Wally Cleaver on Leave It to Beaver from 1957 to 1963. Her last acting roles were guest appearances on Mr. Novak and Perry Mason in 1964.

Later life
In January 1973, Baird became reacquainted with Robert H. Hensley, a friend from the Hollywood Christian Group. Hensley had been an actor, using the professional name of Bob Henry. He also recorded songs, using the name Jericho Brown, and in 1960 he had a top ten hit, Look For a Star.

The couple married, had five children, and the family traveled the country starting churches and singing Gospel songs. In 2005, Baird (Pamela Beaird Hensley) earned a degree in music from Southwestern Assemblies of God University. Her husband died on May 22, 2016.

References

Westminster Choir College alumni
1945 births
Living people
American child actresses
American television actresses
People from Greater Los Angeles
Place of birth missing (living people)
20th-century American actresses
21st-century American women